Marian Álvarez Cachero (born 1 April 1978) is a Spanish actress. She has appeared in more than thirty films since 2000. In 2013 she won the Goya Award for Best Actress and the Silver Shell Award for Best Actress at the 61 San Sebastián International Film Festival for her performance in Wounded.

Filmography 
 2013 -  Wounded - Ana
 2014 - V/H/S: Viral - Martha (segment "Parallel Monsters")
 2015 - Teresa - Teresa de Ávila

References

External links
 

1978 births
Living people
People from Madrid
Spanish film actresses